Cherna Mesta (village) is a village in Yakoruda Municipality, in Blagoevgrad Province, in southwestern Bulgaria. 

Most inhabitants are Pomaks, but they tend to declare themselves as ethnic  Turks. The main religion in Cherna Mesta is Islam.

References

Villages in Blagoevgrad Province